Eva from Argentina is a 2011 Argentine flash animated biographical film, produced by Illusion Studios.

Cast

Francisco Solano López as Himself
Carlos Portaluppi as Rodolfo Walsh
Carlos Russo as Juan Perón

External links
 

2011 films
Argentine animated films
2010s Spanish-language films
2010s Argentine films